Keshet is a national grassroots organization with offices in Boston, New York, and the San Francisco Bay Area that works for the full equality and inclusion of lesbian, gay, bisexual, transgender, and queer Jews in Jewish life. Led and supported by LGBTQ Jews and straight allies, Keshet offers resources, training, and technical assistance to create inclusive Jewish communities nationwide. Keshet produced the documentary Hineini: Coming Out in a Jewish High School and companion curriculum.

On June 18, 2010, it was announced that Jewish Mosaic: The National Center for Sexual and Gender Diversity, another American Jewish LGBT organization, would merge with Keshet, with the post-merger organization retaining the name "Keshet". The merger was aided through a grant from the Charles and Lynn Schusterman Family Foundation. Jewish Mosaic was included in the 2005 and 2006 editions of "Slingshot," a guide to 50 "of the most creative and effective Jewish organizations" in America.

National programs

The Hineini Education Project
The Hineini Education Project trains and supports Jewish educators, clergy, program staff, youth, and lay leaders to ensure that GLBT youth, families, and staff are safe and affirmed in all Jewish educational and community settings. The Hineini Education Project has three major components:

Jewish Safe Schools & Supportive Communities
Individualized staff development trainings, consultations, and workshops that teach concrete strategies for combating anti-GLBT bias, supporting GLBT youth, and creating fully inclusive experiences for all Jewish youth and families. Keshet also runs two intensive Training Institutes annually for Jewish educators and community leaders. Participants are given the tools and guidance to replicate the trainings in their own communities. Keshet also has partnership with Rabbi Steve Greenberg, the first and only openly gay Orthodox rabbi, Keshet's Rabbi-in-Residence.

Film Screenings and Facilitated Workshops
Opportunities to use the Keshet-produced documentary film Hineini: Coming Out in a Jewish High School to explore issues of identity, gender and sexual orientation, Jewish pluralism, Jewish perspectives on homosexuality and gender diversity, and youth-led activism.

Hineini Curriculum Resource Guide
A companion to the film  Hineini that equips Jewish educators with resources to integrate GLBT issues into a wide range of programs and curricula, including Jewish text study history, social studies, health education, or a youth group retreat on diversity in the Jewish community. The materials can be used in both formal and informal educational settings with youth in grades 7-12.

Building Capacity for LGBT Jewish Inclusion
Training and technical support for emerging Jewish LGBT groups to replicate Keshet's Jewish Safe Schools & Supportive Communities Program and build local capacity for fostering inclusion. JPride (San Diego), The Jewish Gay Network of Michigan (Detroit), and JQ International (Los Angeles) are Keshet's first affiliated partners.

KeshetClal Inclusion Project
Responding to changes in Conservative halakha regarding the status of gays and lesbians, Keshet and Rabbi Steve Greenberg have joined together to create an integrated program that combines a text-based, halakhic approach to LGBT inclusion with Keshet's experiential, skills-based Jewish Safe Schools & Supportive Communities trainings. This synthesized approach offers rabbis, lay leaders, and educators concrete skills for understanding and supporting LGBT experience in the context of traditional Judaism.

Massachusetts programs

Transgender Working Group (TWiG)
A support and social group for transgender Jews and allies. TWiG also offers educational programs on transgender issues and fosters trans inclusion in Keshet and in the broader Jewish community.

See also
 Keshet Rabbis

References

Press
"Review of Hineini: Coming Out in a Jewish High School." Video Librarian: The Video Review Magazine for Libraries, March–April 2009.
"Hineini Released on DVD: Boston Release Party Brings About 75 to Club Café." New England Blade, September 24, 2008. 
"Transgender Professor Joy Ladin Faces Life Back at Yeshiva." The Advocate, September 18, 2008. National gay magazine cites Keshet's Transgender Working Group as one of the most prominent groups for transgender Jews in the United States.
"DVD release for groundbreaking documentary about Jewish LGBT youth." Bay Windows, September 17, 2008.
"Training educators, rabbis to welcome, affirm gay Jews." Cleveland Jewish News, August 6, 2008. Read about Keshet's second national training institute for Jewish educators and leaders.
"Educators learn ways to welcome GLBT Jews into the community." JTA, May 8, 2008. Read about Keshet's first national training institute for Jewish educators and leaders. 
"Keshet Goes from Local Org to National Force." The Jewish Advocate, May 2, 2008. 
"Keshet is in Demand." Bay Windows, April 10, 2008.
"All Things Gay Interview with Creator of Keshet, Idit Klein." All Things Gay, July 18, 2011.

External links
Official Website

LGBT Jewish organizations
LGBT organizations in the United States
LGBT political advocacy groups in the United States
Non-profit organizations based in Boston
Organizations established in 1996
1996 establishments in the United States